João Anastácio Rosa (1812–1884) was a Portuguese actor and sculptor.

Works
bust of Almeida Garrett
cartoon, Rafael Bordalo Pinheiro (1846-1905), in the National Library of Portugal
portrait of Francisco Cardeal Patriarcha in the National Library of Portugal

1812 births
1884 deaths
Portuguese caricaturists
Portuguese male actors
19th-century Portuguese people
19th-century Portuguese sculptors
19th-century male artists
Male sculptors
People from Évora District
19th-century male actors